State Road 776 (SR 776) is a  state highway serving southern Sarasota County and northwestern Charlotte County, Florida. It acts as a loop road of U.S. Route 41 (US 41) that bypasses North Port.

Route description
From its western terminus with US 41/SR 45 (Tamiami Trail) near South Venice, SR 776 travels along Englewood Road through Woodmere and North Indiana Avenue in Englewood. This segment was originally a portion of SR 775. After entering Charlotte County, SR 776 continues eastward as McCall Road before turning to the northeast near Charlotte Beach. The State Road crosses Myakka River before becoming El Jobean Road in El Jobean. The eastern terminus of SR 776 is an intersection with the Tamiami Trail and County Road 771 (CR 771) in Murdock, just south of North Port.

A northeastern continuation from the eastern end of SR 776 is Bachman Boulevard, which continues until an intersection with Hillsborough Boulevard at the boundary between Charlotte County and Sarasota County (and the North Port city limit).

Near the eastern end is the Charlotte Sports Park, the spring training home of the American League Tampa Bay Rays baseball team, and the Florida State League Class A-Advanced affiliate Charlotte Stone Crabs.

Major intersections

References

External links

776
776
776